Senwabarwana, also known as Bochum, is a town in the Blouberg Local Municipality of the Capricorn District Municipality in the Limpopo province of South Africa. The town is the seat of the Blouberg Local Municipality. It is located about 93 km northwest of the city Polokwane.

Etymology
The colonial name may refer to the German industrial city of Bochum or be a corruption of Bochim, a biblical name (Judges 2:1 and 5). The place was named by the German missionary Carl Franz and his wife Helene to a mission station they established here in 1890. The majority language group of the area is Northern Sotho people and they refer to themselves as Bahananwa. They call the town Senwabarwana, a commemorative name for an incident that took place in a pond where the Khoi people found and drank water in their travelling, thus passing by. Due to their height they are proclaimed dwarfs by natives which literally means Morwana in Northern Sotho (Sepedi) and in a plural form is Barwana, hence "Sen-wa-barwana".

History
German missionary Carl Franz and his wife Helene founded a hospital that used to cater for people with leprosy. The missionary station was part of the attempts of the Berlin Missionary Society to Christianize Southern Africa in the 19th century. The hospital is now known as Helene-Franz hospital. It has a bad reputation because of its high mortality rates and it is often referred to by old people as "the hospital of death".

The place is also known for its diverse people from chieftaincies such as  Ga-Manthata, Ga-Matlala, Ga-Mmalebogo, Makgababeng, Moletši and the small town of Mogwadi.

Institutions of Higher Education

TVET Colleges
Capricorn TVET College Senwabarwana Campus.

Training Colleges
New Life Computer Training College.

Institutions of Basic Education

Secondary 
Phala Secondary School.
Dikoloi Secondary School 
Seiphi Secondary School 
Phagamang Secondary School.
Kgolothwane Secondary School.
Tema Secondary School
Matthew Phosa Secondary School
Maleboho Senior Secondary School.

Primary
Kgebetli.
Mophamamona
Senwabarwana.
Tefu Primary School.

Special Needs Schools
Ratanang.
Helen Franz.

Health Institutions
Helen Franz Hospital.
Blouberg Hospital.

Shopping Centers
Blouberg Mall.
Bochum Plaza.

Notable people
Punch Masenamela, a professional soccer player.
Clement Maosa, a popular SABC TV actor.
Mamphela Ramphele, an anti-apartheid activist and politician.

References

Populated places in the Blouberg Local Municipality
1890 establishments in the South African Republic